Mezzo Mix (official notation: mezzo mix) is a product of The Coca-Cola Company, first introduced in Germany in 1973. It is a mixture of orange soda and cola, a beverage popular in German-speaking countries, commonly known there as spezi, the generic trademark of the first brand of that type of soda.

Market
Mezzo Mix is sold and produced officially only in Germany, Switzerland and Austria. The brand's slogan translates into English as "Cola Kisses Orange". In Spain it is called Fanta Mezzo Mix Naranja & Cola. In Sweden it is called Fanta Mezzo and was released in late January 2017 as a limited edition, connected to the music event called Melodifestivalen (Swedish qualifications to Eurovision Song Contest).

Mezzo Mix was previously one of eight international soda flavors featured and available for tasting at Club Cool in Epcot.

Mezzo Mix was later introduced in the United Kingdom in 2019, as a selection for the Coca-Cola Freestyle machine.

Varieties
There were two kinds of Mezzo Mix in the 1990s: orange and lemon.  The latter was unpopular and was discontinued, but a lemon flavored Coke entered the market again in 2003. In July 2007, Mezzo Mix Zero was introduced in Germany as a low-calorie variant. Early 2013 around Valentine's Day, Mezzo Mix Berry Love was introduced in Germany. Instead of an orange-like flavor, it is a raspberry flavor mixed with cola. It was a limited edition, being available only in February.

Ingredients
Mezzo Mix contains water, sugar, orange juice, carbonation, caramel coloring for color, citric acid, flavoring, caffeine, ascorbic acid, and stabilizer.

References

External links
Official site 
Mezzo Mix berry love 

Coca-Cola brands
Cola brands